Adrian Van Vinceler Van de Graaff (September 6, 1891 – March 14, 1936) was an American college football player and coach. He played halfback for the Alabama Crimson Tide football of the University of Alabama. After football, he practiced law.

Early years
Adrian was born on September 6, 1891, in Tuscaloosa, Alabama, to Adrian Sebastian "Bass" Van de Graaff and Minnie Cherokee Jemison. Adrian, Sr. was a circuit judge who had been a sub on Yale's football team of 1880. Adrian attended Tuscaloosa High School.

University of Alabama
Following in his father's footsteps, Adrian joined the Alabama football team, becoming a prominent member of its 1911 and 1912 teams. At Alabama he was a member of Phi Delta Theta. Adrian's younger brothers Hargrove and William were also prominent football players for Alabama, William being the program's first All-American. Younger still was Adrian's brother Robert J. Van de Graaff, the inventor of the Van de Graaff Generator which produces high voltages.

1912
Adrian was selected All-Southern in 1912 by Nathan Stauffer of Collier's Weekly.

1917
In 1917, Camp Gordon, the second military opponent Alabama faced as the country mobilized for World War I, beat the Tide 19–6. Camp Gordon had several players with college experience, including Adrian.

Law
Adrian was "one of the most brilliant member of the Alabama bar, having an unusual aptitude for legal research."

References

External links
 

1891 births
1936 deaths
20th-century American lawyers
American football halfbacks
Alabama Crimson Tide football players
Camp Gordon football players
All-Southern college football players
Alabama lawyers
Sportspeople from Tuscaloosa, Alabama
Players of American football from Alabama
American people of Dutch descent